Sisurcana sanguinoventer is a species of moth of the family Tortricidae. It is found in Napo Province, Ecuador.

The wingspan is about 28 mm. The ground colour of the forewings is brown grey, tinged with blackish in the terminal area and the dorsum. The ground colour is paler and more ferruginous brown subterminally. The hindwings are brown, slightly tinged ferruginous posteriorly.

Etymology
The species name refers to the colouration of the ventral site of the abdomen and is derived from Latin sanguis (meaning blood) and venter (meaning stomach).

References

Moths described in 2010
Sisurcana
Moths of South America
Taxa named by Józef Razowski